The 2004 Tour de France was the 91st edition of Tour de France, one of cycling's Grand Tours. The Tour began in Liège on 3 July and finished on the Champs-Élysées in Paris on 25 July.

The first 14 teams in the UCI ranking at 31 January 2004 were automatically invited. These were: Wildcards were sent to a further seven teams.

Initially the organisers had an option for a 22nd team, which would be Kelme, but after Jesús Manzano exposed doping use in that team, Kelme was not invited, and the race started with 21 teams of nine cyclists.

Teams

Qualified teams

Invited teams

Domina Vacanze

Cyclists

By starting number

By team

"DNF" indicates that a rider did not finish the 2004 Tour de France.
"DNS" indicates that a rider did not start.

 indicates highest placed rider of the team in the final overall classification.

By nationality

Notes

References

2004 Tour de France
2004